Siim Kallas (born 2 October 1948) is an Estonian politician, former Prime Minister of Estonia, and former European Commissioner. He served as the European Commissioner for Transport between 2010 and 2014. Before that he was the European Commissioner for Administrative Affairs, Audit and Anti-Fraud between 2004 and 2009. In both Barroso Commissions he was also a Vice-President. He was twice appointed the Acting Commissioner for Economic and Monetary Affairs and the Euro in Olli Rehn's stead, from 19 April 2014 to 25 May 2014 while he was on electoral campaign leave for the 2014 elections to the European Parliament and from 1 July 2014 to 16 July 2014 after he took up his seat.

Prior to his tenure as a European Commissioner, Kallas was the Prime Minister of Estonia, Estonian Minister of Finance, Estonian Minister of Foreign Affairs, a member of the Supreme Council of the Soviet Union and a member of the Riigikogu. Kallas is a member and former leader of the free-market liberal Estonian Reform Party and a former vice-president of Liberal International.

After leaving the European Commission, Kallas ran in the Estonian presidential election in 2016, but was not elected. In October 2017, he started as the municipal mayor of Viimsi Parish. His daughter, Kaja Kallas, is the current prime minister of Estonia.

Education
1966–1969, 1972–1974 Budget and Finance, University of Tartu, specialist
(1969–1972 Junior Sergeant, Soviet Armed Forces Corps of Signals)
1974–1977 Economics of environmental protection, University of Tartu, Candidate of Sciences

Career
1969–1972 : Signals officer in Soviet Army
1975–1979: Specialist at the Finance Ministry Planning Committee of the Estonian SSR
1979–1986: Joint Secretary of the Central Authority of the Savings Banks of the Estonian SSR.
1986–1989: Deputy chief editor of the Communist Party of Estonia newspaper Rahva Hääl
1989–1991: Chairman of the Central Union of the Estonian Trade Unions
1989–1991: Member of the Supreme Council of the Soviet Union
1991–1995: President of the Bank of Estonia
1995–2004 and from 2019: Member of the Parliament of the Republic of Estonia
1995–1996: Minister of Foreign Affairs
1996: Chairman of the Committee of Ministers of the Council of Europe
1999–2002: Minister of Finance
2002–2003: Prime minister
2004–2004: EU Commissioner for Economic and Monetary Affairs, serving with Joaquín Almunia
2004–2010: EU Commissioner for Administrative Affairs, Audit and Anti-Fraud and Vice-president of the Commission
2010–2014: EU Commissioner for Transport and Vice-president of the Commission
2017–2019: Municipal mayor of Viimsi.

Personal life

Kallas' grandfather was Eduard Alver, one of the founders of the Republic of Estonia on 24 February 1918, and the Commander of the Estonian Defence League during the Estonian War of Independence, and the first chief of the Estonian Police from 1918 to 24 May 1919. He speaks Estonian, English, Russian, Finnish, and German. Kallas is of Estonian and distant Baltic German ancestry. Kallas is married to doctor Kristi Kallas. He has one son and one daughter; his daughter Kaja Kallas is the current leader of the Reform party and Prime Minister of Estonia since 2021. During the Soviet deportations from Estonia his wife Kristi Kallas, 6 months old at the time, was deported to Siberia with her mother and grandmother in a cattle car and lived there until she was 10 years old.

Controversy

Kallas' inability to address some politically controversial issues such as corruption caused him to renounce his candidacy for the office of Prime Minister of Estonia in 2014.

References

External links

Siim Kallas, Official Media Gallery
Official website
KALLAS Siim International Who's Who
European Parliament Answers to Commissioner Designate M. Kallas

|-

|-

|-

|-

|-

|-

|-

|-

|-

1948 births
20th-century Estonian politicians
21st-century Estonian politicians
Chairmen of the Bank of Estonia
Estonian European Commissioners
Estonian people of Baltic German descent
Estonian Reform Party politicians
Finance ministers of Estonia
Government ministers of Estonia
Grand Crosses with Star and Sash of the Order of Merit of the Federal Republic of Germany
Leaders of political parties in Estonia
Living people
Members of the Riigikogu, 1995–1999
Members of the Riigikogu, 1999–2003
Members of the Riigikogu, 2003–2007
Members of the Riigikogu, 2019–2023
Members of the Riigikogu, 2023–2027
Ministers of Foreign Affairs of Estonia
Politicians from Tallinn
Prime Ministers of Estonia
Recipients of the Order of the National Coat of Arms, 1st Class
Recipients of the Order of the National Coat of Arms, 2nd Class
Resigned Communist Party of the Soviet Union members
University of Tartu alumni